Ramshaw is a village in County Durham, in England. It is situated to the west of Bishop Auckland. Ramshaw was originally a mining village and is home to one restaurants, the Bridge Inn. The River Gaunless runs through Ramshaw. The name Gaunless itself is of later Norse origin, meaning useless. It is believed that this derives from the river's inability to power a mill, sustain fish or create fertile floodplains. The bridge connecting Ramshaw with neighbouring village Evenwood is between 300 and 500 years old. Ramshaw has a caravan site.

References

Villages in County Durham